The National Police Service, also known as the General Directorate "National Police" (Bulgarian: Главна дирекция "Национална полиция", ГДНП) is an independent agency of the Ministry of the Interior responsible for general law enforcement in Bulgaria.

History

Directorate for Police and State Security (1925-1944) 
With the creation of the "Law for administration and police" in 1925 was established the "Police and State Security Directorate" . Its duties included enforcing laws and ensuring the safety of the country. It continued to function until 1944 with the creation of the People's Militia.

Militia (1944-1989) 
The People's Militia was established by the Council of Ministers with Decree No. 1 on 10 September 1944. The Directorate of the People's Militia is structured into two departments: State Security and People's Militia. On April 1, 1947, the Main Directorate of the People's Militia was established, which included: Directorate of State Security and Directorate of the People's Militia. In 1991, the name of the People's Militia was to the National Police.

General Directorate of the National Police (1991-) 
With the fall of communism in 1991 was established the National Police Directorate and later, in 1993 was accepted the new law for the national police. In 2008 the national police numbered 47000 officers and 5000 administrative workers.

Directors 

 Encho Staykov (September 1944)
 Radenko Vidinsky (September – November 1944)
 Rusi Hristozov (November 1944  – April 1947)
 Blagoi Penev (January 10, 1948 – April 20, 1950)
 Major General Georgi Krastev (March – October 1963)
 Colonel Petko Stoyanov (1953 – May 1954; 1957 – 1963)
 Grigor Shopov (June 18, 1963 - ?)
 Major General Georgi Krastev (? - April 1966)
 Lieutenant General Nikola Angelov (April 1966 – December 1969)
 Major General Kostadin Iliev (July 17, 1972 - October 22, 1981)
 Major General Ivan Dimitrov (October 22, 1981 – February 21, 1990)
 Colonel Hristo Velichkov (1990)
 Colonel Viktor Mihailov (1990-December 1992)
 Major General Hristo Marinski (January 3-February 19, 1997)
 Colonel Slavcho Bosilkov (February 19, 1997 – December 3, 1998)
 Major General Vasil Vasilev (December 3, 1998 – December 15, 2003)
 Major General Ilia Iliev (December 15, 2003 – September 21, 2005)
 Lieutenant General Valentin Petrov (September 21, 2005 – November 28, 2007)
 Chief Commissioner Veselin Petrov (November 28, 2007 – July 1, 2008)
 Chief Commissioner Krasimir Petrov (July 1, 2008 – November 25, 2013)
 Chief Commissioner Todor Grebenarov (November 25, 2013 – February 24, 2015)
 Chief Commissioner Hristo Terziyski (February 24, 2015 – July 24, 2020)
 Senior Commissioner Nikolay Hadzhiev (July 24, 2020 - June 8, 2021)
 Chief Commissioner Stanimir Stanev  (June 8, 2021 – January 4, 2022)
 Senior Commissioner Atanas Ilkov (January 4, 2022 – January 7, 2022)
 Chief Commissioner Vencislav Kirchev (January 7, 2022 – August 9, 2022)
 Atanas Ilkov (since August 9, 2022 - current director of the National Police)

Structure
Police cars at a police station parking lot in Sofia.

The National Police has the following structure:

General Directorate "National Police"
Director
departments and sectors directly subordinated to the Director
Deputy Director
Criminal Police Department
Economic Police Department
Deputy Director
Department for Investigations
Department for Methodic Supervision of Investigations
independent sectors
Deputy Director
Public Order and Territorial Police Department - Security Police, Traffic Police 
Gendarmerie Directorate

Ranks and shoulder insignia of the Bulgarian police officers 
Officers

Others

See also
Ministry of Justice

Crime:
 Crime in Bulgaria

References

External links
Official website

Law enforcement agencies of Bulgaria